Lea Koenig (or Lia Koenig; ; born Lea Kamien; 30 November 1929) is an Israeli actress, nicknamed The First Lady of Israeli Theatre.

Biography
Lea Koenig was born in 1929 in Łódź, Poland, to a secular Jewish family of Ashkenazi Jewish descent. Her parents were the Yiddish actors Dina and Józef Kamień. She spent her childhood in Poland, then in Tashkent, in the Uzbek Soviet Socialist Republic. Her father was murdered in the Holocaust. In the end of the 1940s, Lea Koenig with her mother emigrated to Romania, where she began studying at National University of Arts in Bucharest and debuted at Jewish Theatre.  In 1961, she emigrated to Israel.

Primarily acting in Hebrew, Koenig performs in Israel and all over the world also in Yiddish theaters. She speaks English, Hebrew, German, Polish, Romanian, Russian and Yiddish.

Awards and honors
 In 1987, Koenig was awarded the Israel Prize for acting.
 Both the Tel Aviv University and Bar-Ilan University have conferred Honorary Doctorates on her.
 In 2012 she received the EMET Prize for art and culture

See also
List of Israel Prize recipients

External links
 Official website

References

1929 births
Living people
Israeli stage actresses
Polish emigrants to Israel
Jewish Israeli actresses
Polish actresses
Actors from Łódź
People from Łódź Voivodeship (1919–1939)
Israel Prize in theatre recipients
Israel Prize women recipients
Israeli Ashkenazi Jews
Israeli people of Polish-Jewish descent
Polish Ashkenazi Jews